José Manuel Fernandes is a Portuguese politician of the Social Democratic Party who has been serving as a Member of the European Parliament since the 2009 elections. Earlier in his career, he was President of Municipal Chamber of Vila Verde in northern Portugal.

Political career
In parliament, Fernandes is a member of the Committee on Budgets. He is also his parliamentary group's coordinator on the committee. In this capacity, he was the parliament's rapporteur on the 2012 and 2016 annual budgets as well as the European Fund for Strategic Investments.

In addition to his committee assignments, Fernandes is part of the parliament's delegations to Brazil, for relations with Mercosur and to the Euro-Latin American Parliamentary Assembly. He had previously been a member of the delegations to China (2009–2014), to the Parliamentary Assembly of the Union for the Mediterranean (2014–2019) and for relations with the Maghreb countries and the Arab Maghreb Union (2014–2019). He is also a member of the European Parliament Intergroup on Seas, Rivers, Islands and Coastal Areas, the European Parliament Intergroup on Disability and the MEPs Against Cancer group.

Following the 2019 elections, Fernandes was part of a cross-party working group in charge of drafting the European Parliament's five-year work program on economic and fiscal policies as well as trade.

Recognition
In 2020, Fernandes was voted the most influential Portuguese MEP of 2020.

References

Living people
MEPs for Portugal 2019–2024
Social Democratic Party (Portugal) MEPs
Social Democratic Party (Portugal) politicians
Year of birth missing (living people)